Karl Gass (2 February 1917, Mannheim, Grand Duchy of Baden – 29 January 2009) was a German documentary filmmaker.

He was a soldier in the elite Panzer-Grenadier-Division Großdeutschland of the Wehrmacht throughout the duration of WW2, where he served as a lieutenant on the Western and Eastern campaigns, until he was captured by the British with the defeat of Nazi Germany. After being released from captivity after the war, he became a documentary maker.   With over 120 films, he was among the most productive documentary directors of the GDR, and produced DEFA documentaries. He had the idea for the DEFA long term documentary "Die Kinder von Golzow" (The children of Golzow). He was born in Mannheim and died in Kleinmachnow, aged 91. According to Frank Pergande, Gass was "one of the most influential propagandists" of the state.

References

External links 

1917 births
2009 deaths
Mass media people from Mannheim
People from the Grand Duchy of Baden
Socialist Unity Party of Germany politicians
Recipients of the National Prize of East Germany
Recipients of the Art Prize of the German Democratic Republic
German documentary filmmakers
Film people from Baden-Württemberg
German Army officers of World War II
German prisoners of war in World War II held by the United Kingdom